Douglas Correia de Souza (born 20 August 1995) is a Brazilian volleyball player, former member of the Brazil men's national volleyball team, 2016 Olympic Champion, silver medallist of the 2014 World Championship, gold medallist of the 2019 World Cup, two–time South American Champion (2017, 2019). On the club level, he plays for Vôlei Taubaté.

Personal life
He is openly gay. He is currently the most followed volleyball player in the world on Instagram.

Sporting achievements

Clubs
 National championships
 2018/2019  Brazilian Championship, with Vôlei Taubaté
 2019/2020  Brazilian SuperCup, with Vôlei Taubaté
 2020/2021  Brazilian SuperCup, with Vôlei Taubaté

Youth national team
 2011  CSV U17 South American Championship
 2012  CSV U19 South American Championship
 2013  FIVB U21 World Championship
 2014  CSV U21 South American Championship
 2014  CSV U23 South American Championship

Individual awards
 2012: CSV U19 South American Championship – Best Server
 2014: CSV U21 South American Championship – Most Valuable Player
 2014: CSV U23 South American Championship – Most Valuable Player
 2015: Pan American Games – Best Outside Hitter
 2018: FIVB World Championship – Best Outside Spiker

References

External links
 Player profile at Olympic.org
 Player profile at WorldofVolley.com
 Player profile at Volleybox.net
 2013 FIVB U21 World Championship – Team Brazil
 2018 FIVB World Championship – Team Brazil
 2019 FIVB World Cup – Team Brazil

1995 births
Living people
Gay sportsmen
LGBT volleyball players
Brazilian LGBT sportspeople
People from Santa Bárbara d'Oeste
Brazilian men's volleyball players
Olympic volleyball players of Brazil
Volleyball players at the 2016 Summer Olympics
Olympic medalists in volleyball
Olympic gold medalists for Brazil
Medalists at the 2016 Summer Olympics
Pan American Games medalists in volleyball
Pan American Games silver medalists for Brazil
Volleyball players at the 2015 Pan American Games
Medalists at the 2015 Pan American Games
Volleyball players at the 2020 Summer Olympics
21st-century LGBT people
Outside hitters
Sportspeople from São Paulo (state)